Dražen Kühn (born 1965) is a Croatian actor. He has appeared in more than forty films since 1991.

Selected filmography

References

External links
 

1965 births
Living people
People from Špišić Bukovica
Croatian male film actors